Taurocholic acid, known also as cholaic acid, cholyltaurine, or acidum cholatauricum, is a deliquescent yellowish crystalline bile acid involved in the emulsification of fats. It occurs as a sodium salt in the bile of mammals. It is a conjugate of cholic acid with taurine. In medical use, it is administered as a cholagogue and choleretic.

Hydrolysis of taurocholic acid yields taurine.

For commercial use, taurocholic acid is manufactured from cattle bile, a byproduct of the meat-processing industry.

This acid is also one of the many molecules in the body that has cholesterol as its precursor.

Toxicity
The median lethal dose of taurocholic acid in newborn rats is 380 mg/kg.

See also
 Deoxycholic acid

References

Bile acids
Cholanes
Deliquescent substances